Argh!, Aargh!, Aaargh! or variants may refer to:

Aaargh!, a 1987 video game
Aaagh!, a 2006 album by Republic of Loose
ARGH Power Ratings, a sports rating system often associated with NCAA football and basketball.
ARGH, another name for the small G protein RhoGan important component of cell signalling networks.
AARGH (Artists Against Rampant Government Homophobia)

See also
 AAH (disambiguation)